Top Model Sverige, Season 4 (Top Model Sverige: Killar & Tjejer), is the fourth season of the Swedish reality television show in which a number of women compete for the title of Sweden's Next Top Model and a chance to start their career in the modelling industry. The prize also included a feature in Swedish Plaza Kvinna and a modelling contract with Stockholmsgruppen. The finalists live and compete in Cape Town.

This is the first season of Sweden's Next Top Model to include more than 11 contestants, as well as the first season to feature male contestants. This is also the first season to have more than 11 episodes, with 40 episodes broadcast for 10 weeks. Also the length of the episode was shortened from 60 minutes to 30.

The winner of the competition was 22-year-old Feben Negash from Sundbyberg.

Contestants
(ages stated are at start of contest)

Episodes

Episode 1
Original Air Date: February 24, 2014

The 24 female semi-finalists meet Caroline and Jonas, and are asked to talk about themselves. After their interview, the girls were asked to either step back to the beginning of the runway, or to a red carpet beside it. Once they've all been interviewed, it is revealed that the 12 girls standing on the red carpet hadn't left a lasting impression on the judges. In order to not be eliminated, the girls have to do a photo shoot. They have to walk into a room, stand on a marked spot. Once they're on the mark, they have 30 seconds to strike a pose before the camera automatically takes a photo of them. In the end, six of them are eliminated: Annika, Greta, Linnea, Lovisa N., Maja and Rebecca A.

Episode 2
Original Air Date: February 25, 2014

The remaining 18 girls have a photo shoot, where they have to embody Eve in paradise. They get to choose between three props; a snake, an apple and a leaf. Everyone chooses the snake, but Feben, who chooses the apple.
In the evening, after the photo shoot, Jonas tells the girls that four more will be eliminated the next day.

Episode 3
Original Air Date: February 26, 2014

The 18 remaining girls are put in front of the judges once again, and are asked about why they want to be in the competition. Once they've all been interviewed, the judges review the photos, and the decide on the four girls who should be eliminated. In the end, Jovana, Malin, Mitou and Rebecca F. are eliminated. The remaining 14 girls are told they are the finalists, and that they'll be travelling overseas the following day.

Episode 4
Original Air Date: February 27, 2014

The girls arrive at Arlanda, and are told they will travel to Cape Town. On their way to Cape Town they transit in Frankfurt, where they are told that only half of them can go all the way to Cape Town. In order to decide which 7 girls should be eliminated, the girls have a photo shoot in which they style themselves with what they have in their bags. At the end of the day, Alexandra, Alicia, Fannie V., Lisa A., Lisa NJ., Lovisa H. and Sandra are eliminated. The remaining seven girls then fly first class to Cape Town.

Episode 5
Original Air Date: March 3, 2014

The girls arrive in Cape Town, and are sent to their house. They quickly start wondering about why there are so many locked doors in the house, and they all assume that they're not the only finalists. While they're relaxing in the backyard, the seven male finalists walk out to greet them. Astrid is annoyed and refuses to introduce herself.
The next day, when Ellinor is in the bathroom doing her make-up, Sebastian walks in and asks her about what's up with the skin on her arm. She tells him about that she has psoriasis, and how she almost didn't sign up for the show because of it. Sebastian convinces her to tell the other guys about it. She doesn't really want to at first, but eventually collects enough courage to. Later, Caroline and Jonas meet the contestants at their house and tell them they're having their first challenge. They announce they're having a walk-off, and the guys and girls are asked to pick out three people to represent each team. In the end, the girls win, and as a reward they get to watch the guys do their photo shoot the following day.

Episode 6
Original Air Date: March 4, 2014

The guys are all assigned animals to embody:

After the animals has been assigned, the models all go to a savanna, where they meet with Caroline and Nina. Caroline announces the new elimination format; if a guy takes the best photo of the week, only the girls are up for elimination, and vice versa. Afterwards, the guys go into their shoot. When they're all done, Caroline reveals that they will find out who took the best photo in the evening.
In the evening, the models receive an envelope with a photo in. Astrid opens it, and shows Joakim's photo, meaning he was the best of the guys that week. He gets to put his photo up on a special wall in the house.

Episode 7
Original Air Date: March 5, 2014

The girls get a note from Caroline, saying they have to expect a cute shock. In Swedish, cute is söt, which also means sweet, therefore some girls associate it with candy. All contestants go to a savanna. They meet with Jonas and Nina, who shows them a bunch of baby lions that the girls will be posing with.
Later in the evening, the contestants get an envelope, like the previous day. Kostas opens it and shows Feben's photo, meaning she was the best girl that week. She gets to put her photo next to Joakim's on the special wall.

Episode 8
Original Air Date: March 6, 2014

The contestants go to panel to have their photos evaluated. Once everyone has been evaluated, Feben and Joakim are asked to step forward. Caroline reveals that Joakim took the best photo out of the two, which also means that all guys are safe. Astrid and Fanny land in the bottom two. In the end, Astrid is allowed to stay, however, she states that it doesn't feel right to stay over Fanny, and wants to give her place to her. Caroline does not allow her to, as the rules say that the decision the judges make is final, thus Fanny must leave the competition.

 First call-out: Joakim Journath	
 Bottom two: Astrid Wesström & Fanny Karlsson	
 Eliminated: Fanny Karlsson

Episode 9
Original Air Date: March 10, 2014

The aspiring models receive their make-overs.

Episode 10
Original Air Date: March 11, 2014

The remaining females pose in a flower swing for their next photo shoot.

Episode 11
Original Air Date: March 12, 2014

The males pose in a yacht & pose while riding on a jet ski for their next photo shoot.

Episode 12
Original Air Date: March 13, 2014

 First call-out: Konstantinos Vlastaras	
 Bottom two: Astrid Wesström & Jennifer Larsén	
 Eliminated: Astrid Wesström

Episode 13
Original Air Date: March 17, 2014

Episode 14
Original Air Date: March 18, 2014

The males do their photo shoot while hanging from Roman rings.

Episode 15
Original Air Date: March 19, 2014

The remaining females get harnessed from a bridge for their next photo shoot.

Episode 16
Original Air Date: March 20, 2014

 First call-out: Agnes Hedengård
 Bottom two: Michael Gustafsson & Sanel Dzubur	
 Eliminated: Sanel Dzubur

Episode 17
Original Air Date: March 24, 2014

Episode 18
Original Air Date: March 25, 2014

The remaining males become DJs for their upcoming photo shoot session.

Episode 19
Original Air Date: March 26, 2014

The female models pose on a bed of ivy plants for their photo shoot.

Episode 20
Original Air Date: March 27, 2014

 First call-out: Ellinor Bjurström	
 Bottom two: David Lundin & Konstantinos Vlastaras
 Eliminated: David Lundin

Episode 21
Original Air Date: March 31, 2014

Episode 22
Original Air Date: April 1, 2014

Episode 23
Original Air Date: April 2, 2014

The aspiring models participate in a crazy Neon trampoline photo shoot.

Episode 24
Original Air Date: April 3, 2014

 First call-out: Ellinor Bjurström & Konstantinos Vlastaras	
 Bottom two: Jennifer Larsén & Sebastian Lysén	
 Eliminated: Sebastian Lysén

Episode 25
Original Air Date: April 7, 2014

Episode 26
Original Air Date: April 8, 2014

Episode 27
Original Air Date: April 9, 2014

The aspiring models participate in a black-and-white photo shoot about BDSM in groups and pairs.

Episode 28
Original Air Date: April 10, 2014

 First call-out: Ellinor Bjurström & Konstantinos Vlastaras	
 Bottom two: Michael Gustafsson & Joakim Journath	
 Eliminated: Joakim Journath

Episode 29
Original Air Date: April 14, 2014

Episode 30
Original Air Date: April 15, 2014

Episode 31
Original Air Date: April 16, 2014

The aspiring models participate in a boat trip shoot in pairs.

Episode 32
Original Air Date: April 17, 2014

 First call-out: Feben Negash & Konstantinos Vlastaras	
 Bottom two: Elzana Kadric & Jennifer Larsén	
 Eliminated: Elzana Kadric

Episode 33
Original Air Date: April 21, 2014

The aspiring models participate in go-sees.

Episode 34
Original Air Date: April 22, 2014

The aspiring models hitchhike to various cities for their photo shoot. Michael was deemed best for the week, while Ellinor, Jennifer and Kevin land in the bottom 3. Caroline reveals that Kevin is eliminated first, leaving Ellinor and Jennifer in the bottom two. But Caroline decides that Ellinor is safe for the next week, and Jennifer is sent home packing bags with Kevin.

 First call-out: Michael Gustafsson
 Bottom three: Ellinor Bjurström, Jennifer Larsén & Kevin Montero
 Eliminated: Jennifer Larsén & Kevin Montero

Episode 35
Original Air Date: April 23, 2014

The aspiring models stroll in sand dunes for their photo shoot.

Episode 36
Original Air Date: April 24, 2014

 First call-out: Ellinor Bjurström	
 Bottom two: Michael Gustafsson & Konstantinos Vlastaras
 Eliminated: Konstantinos Vlastaras

Episode 37
Original Air Date: April 28, 2014

The aspiring models visit Langa, Cape Town, and participate at a photo shoot for Project Playground for disadvantaged kids and young people.

Episode 38
Original Air Date: April 29, 2014

 First call-out: Ellinor Bjurström	
 Bottom two: Feben Negash & Michael Gustafsson
 Eliminated: Michael Gustafsson

Episode 39
Original Air Date: April 30, 2014

The remaining females participate in a cover shoot for Plaza Woman South Africa to be implemented by chief editors Jennie Birgmark and Malin Lundberg. There was no call-out order, and Caroline declares that Agnes is eliminated, making Ellinor and Feben the two finalists.

 Eliminated: Agnes Hedengård

Episode 40
Original Air Date: May 1, 2014

 Final two: Ellinor Bjurström & Feben Negash
 Sweden's Next Top Model: Feben Negash

Summaries

Call-out order

 The contestant received best photo and won immunity for his/her gender
 The contestant was immune from elimination, and was put through collectively to the next episode
 Had the other gender received best photo, the contestant would've been eliminated 
 The contestant was eliminated
  The contestant was got double best performance
 The contestant won the Competition
.
Episode 1 = Criminal's In Jail With Chain And Paparazzi,Differnet Wrapped in Black And White Group Shot At Jail

Episode 2 = Different Fetish

Episode 3 = High Fashion Sexy In Waterpark

Episode 4 = Chaos Beauty

Episode 5 = Crazy Fashion With Simple Furniture

Episode 6 = Wire Stunt Fighter,Posing Elegant And Messy On A Pile Of Fruit Pieces

Episode 7 = Medusa Burried With Snake's

Episode 8 = Running In The Treadmill Runaway

Episode 9 = Marocco High Fashion Editorial, Colaborate Morocco Culture In Catalogue

Episode 10 = Rock Punk In Compcard 

Episode 11 = Fashion Film Classic Story Woman In Train, 1920's Fashion of Campaign Commercial 

Episode 12 = Top Model Party, Vogue Magazine, Winner Documenter Video, Kawasaki Ambasador

Photo Shoot Guide
 Episode 1 Photo Shoot: Simplistic Full Body Shots (Female Casting)
 Episode 2 Photo Shoot: Eve in Paradise with a Snake (Female Casting)
 Episode 4 Photo Shoot: Posing in a Hangar (Female Casting)
 Episode 6 Photo Shoot: Embodying Animals in the Savanna (Males)
 Episode 7 Photo Shoot: Posing with a Baby Lion (Females)
 Episode 9 Photo Shoot: Make-overs (Males & Females)
 Episode 10 Photo Shoot: Sitting on a Flower Swing in a Garden (Females)
 Episode 11 Photo Shoot: Posing on a Yacht & Jet Skiing (Males)
 Episode 14 Photo Shoot: Gymnasts Hanging from Roman Rings (Males)
 Episode 15 Photo Shoot: Hanging Harnessed Under a Bridge (Females)
 Episode 18 Photo Shoot: Disc Jockeys at a Party (Males)
 Episode 19 Photo Shoot: Nude and Natural among Ivy Plants (Females)
 Episode 23 Photo Shoot: Jumping from a Trampoline in Neon Clothing
 Episode 27 Photo Shoot: Black-and-white BDSM in Groups and Pairs
 Episode 31 Photo Shoot: Boat Trip in Pairs
 Episode 34 Photo Shoot: Hitchhiking to various Cities
 Episode 35 Photo Shoot: Sand Dunes Stroll for Maybelline
 Episode 37 Photo Shoot: Project Playground Campaign
 Episode 39 Photo Shoot: Cover shoot for Plaza Woman
 Episode 40 Photo Shoot: Editorial for Plaza Woman

Post-Top Model Careers
Feben Negash has collected her prizes and signed with Stockholmsgruppen. She has also shot for Veckorevyn magazine.
David Lundin signed with Stockholmsgruppen, Elite Model Management in Stockholm and Joy Models in Milan. He also walked for Dirk Bikkembergs for the Spring/Summer 2015 season in Milan.
Michael Gustafsson signed with Stockholsmgruppen and Elite Model Management in Stockholm.
Sebastian Lysén signed with Lind Models in Stockholm.
Astrid Wesström signed with Stockholmsgruppen.
Agnes Hedengård signed with Stockholmsgruppen.
Joakim Journath signed with Stockholmsgruppen.
Jennifer Larsén signed with New Version Models.
Fanny Karlsson signed with New Version Models, under the name "Freja". She is also signed with P Models, Flash Model Management and Base Models.

References

Sweden's Next Top Supermodel
2014 Swedish television seasons

it:Sweden's Next Top Model
sv:Top Model Sverige